Harry Hedegaard (7 November 1894 – 19 July 1939) was a Danish swimmer. At the age of 17, he competed for Denmark in the men's 400m freestyle and the men's 1,500m freestyle at the 1912 Summer Olympics.

References

External links
 

1894 births
1939 deaths
Olympic swimmers of Denmark
Swimmers at the 1912 Summer Olympics
Swimmers from Copenhagen
Danish male freestyle swimmers